The 337th Infantry Division was a German Army infantry division in World War II.  It was formed on 16 November 1940 in Kempten. The division was destroyed on the Eastern front in July 1944 and formed the stab of Divisionsgruppe 337 on 7 August 1944 which later was the basis of the 337. Volks-Grenadier-Division.

Commanding officers
Generalleutnant Karl Spang, 15 November 1940 – 2 May 1941
Generalleutnant Kurt Pflieger, 19 May 1941 – 15 March 1942
General der Artillerie Erich Marcks, 15 March 1942 – 20 September 1942
Generalleutnant Otto Schünemann, 5 October 1942 – 27 December 1943
Generalleutnant Walter Scheller, 27 December 1943 – July 1944

External links

Infantry divisions of Germany during World War II
Military units and formations established in 1940
Military units and formations disestablished in 1944